Eferding Airport is a private use airport located  northwest of Eferding, Oberösterreich, Austria.

See also
List of airports in Austria

References

External links 
 Airport record for Eferding Airport at Landings.com

Airports in Austria
Upper Austria